The Bătrâna is a right tributary of the river Someșul Cald in Romania. It flows into the Someșul Cald near Smida.

References

Rivers of Romania
Rivers of Bihor County
Rivers of Cluj County